Coleus dissitiflorus, synonym Plectranthus dissitiflorus, is a species of flowering plant in the family Lamiaceae. It is found only in Cameroon. Its natural habitat is subtropical or tropical dry forests.  C. dissitiflorus is threatened by habitat loss.

References

dissitiflorus
Endemic flora of Cameroon
Critically endangered plants
Taxonomy articles created by Polbot
Taxobox binomials not recognized by IUCN